Combret is a commune in the Aveyron department in southern France. It has a bridge over the river Rance, which runs alongside the village.

Population

Administration
Claude Barthélémy was the mayor between 2001 and 2020. Jean-Philippe Sabathier was elected mayor in 2020.

See also
Communes of the Aveyron department

References

Communes of Aveyron
Aveyron communes articles needing translation from French Wikipedia